Kamryn Pettway (born December 20, 1996) is an American football running back for the Columbus Lions. He played college football at Auburn.

Early years
Pettway attended Prattville High School in Prattville, Alabama. As a senior, he rushed 1,402 yards with 17 touchdowns. He committed to Auburn University to play college football.

College career
After redshirting his first year at Auburn in 2014, Pettway played in 12 games as a fullback in 2015. As a redshirt sophomore in 2016, he played in 10 games and was Auburn's leading rusher with 1,224 yards on 209 carries with seven touchdowns. He was named first-team All-SEC. After his team’s loss in the 2018 Peach Bowl, Pettway announced that he would forgo his final year of eligibility and enter the 2018 NFL Draft.

Professional career
Pettway signed with the Minnesota Vikings as an undrafted free agent on April 30, 2018. He was waived on May 7, 2018.

In November 2020, he signed with the Rarámuris de Ciudad Juárez of the Fútbol Americano de México ahead of the 2021 season.

References

External links
Auburn Tigers bio

Living people
1996 births
Players of American football from Montgomery, Alabama
American football fullbacks
Auburn Tigers football players
Minnesota Vikings players
American expatriate players of American football
American expatriate sportspeople in Mexico